Ilaria Bianco (born May 29, 1980, in Pisa) is an Italian sabre fencer. Between 1999 and 2005, Bianco had won a total of five medals (one gold, three silver, and one bronze), as a member of the Italian team, at the World Fencing Championships. She is a member of the fencing team for the Italian Military Air Force, and is coached and trained by Nicola Zanotti.

Bianco represented Italy at the 2008 Summer Olympics in Beijing, where she competed in the women's individual sabre event, along with her teammate Gioia Marzocca. She defeated China's Huang Haiyang in the preliminary round of thirty-two, before losing out her next match to Russia's Sofiya Velikaya, with a score of 6–15.

References

External links
Profile – FIE
EuroFencing Profile
NBC 2008 Olympics profile

Italian female fencers
Living people
Olympic fencers of Italy
Fencers at the 2008 Summer Olympics
Fencers at the 2016 Summer Olympics
Universiade medalists in fencing
Sportspeople from Pisa
1980 births
Mediterranean Games bronze medalists for Italy
Mediterranean Games medalists in fencing
Competitors at the 2009 Mediterranean Games
Universiade gold medalists for Italy
Medalists at the 2001 Summer Universiade